is a city located in Saitama Prefecture, Japan. , the city had an estimated population of 114,566 in 53,053 households and a population density of 7800 persons per km².

Geography
Fujimino is located in southern Saitama, in flat land on the northern edge of the Musashino Terrace. It is located approximately 30 kilometers from downtown Tokyo. The Shingashi River, which was a waterway for boat transportation connecting Kawagoe and Tokyo until early modern times, runs along the northern city border. The city measures approximately 7.5 kilometers from east-to-west by 6.0 kilometers from north-to-south.

Surrounding municipalities
 Saitama Prefecture
 Kawagoe
 Fujimi
 Miyoshi

Climate
Fujimino has a Humid subtropical climate (Köppen Cfa) characterized by warm summers and cool winters with light to no snowfall.  The average annual temperature in Fujimino is 14.8 °C. The average annual rainfall is 1426 mm with September as the wettest month. The temperatures are highest on average in August, at around 26.7 °C, and lowest in January, at around 4.0 °C.

Demographics
Per Japanese census data, the population of Fujimino expanded rapidly in the late 20th century and has grown at a slower pace in the 21st.

History
Earthenware pottery fragments from the Kamifukuoka Shell Mound dating to the Early Jōmon period, were discovered beneath the Dainihon Print Company in Fujimino, indicating a long period of settlement. The city also has an important early Kofun period archaeological site, the Gongenyama Tumuli Cluster, from the late 3rd century. During the Edo period, the port of Fukuoka was an important river port on a branch of the Arakawa River and was under the control of Kawagoe Domain.

The village of Fukuoka was created within Iruma District, Saitama with the establishment of the modern municipalities system on April 1, 1889. The first public housing estates (Uenodai and Kasumigaoka) in Japan were built in Fukuoka after the Second World War. The village was raised to town status in 1960 as population expanded rapidly due to new town developments, and to city status on April 10, 1972, changing its name to Kamifukuoka to avoid confusion with the more famous city of Fukuoka in Kyushu.

The city of Fujimino was established on October 1, 2005, from the merger of the city of Kamifukuoka, and the neighboring town of Ōi (from Iruma District).

Government
Fujimino has a mayor-council form of government with a directly elected mayor and a unicameral city council of 21 members. Fujimino, together with the town of Miyoshi, contributes two members to the Saitama Prefectural Assembly. In terms of national politics, the city is part of Saitama 8th district of the lower house of the Diet of Japan.

Economy
Due to its location, Fujimino is primarily a bedroom community with over 25% of its population commuting to the Tokyo metropolis for work. There are a number of industrial parks in the city.

Education
Fujimino has 13 public elementary schools and six public middle schools operated by the city government, and one public high school operated by the Saitama Prefectural Board of Education. Bunkyo University also has a campus in Fujimino.

Public facilities
There are two libraries, two public swimming pools (summer season only), and a number of public halls and community centres.

Transportation

Railway
 Tōbu Railway -  Tōbu Tōjō Line

Highway

Local attractions
Jizoin Temple, famous for a weeping cherry tree which is more than 300 years old.
Benten-no-mori Park, which has a small temple noted for cherry blossoms in spring, and kudzu in autumn.
Shingashi River, used for transporting goods in the Edo period, with a warehouse from the 1870s now called the Fukuokagashi Riverside Heritage Hall. 
Green Park, on the bank of the Shingashi River, noted as a location where Tokugawa Ieyasu used to go falconing.

 Chūō Park.

Festivals
There are two major festivals in Fujimino: the Kamifukuoka Tanabata Festival and the Oi Festival.

Kamifukuoka Tanabata Festival
This is a lively festival held on the first Saturday and Sunday of August every year since more than 50 years ago. It includes a bamboo decoration contest, Awa Odori dancing, Bon Odori dancing, and traditional taiko drumming.

Oi Festival
Oi Festival is held in the middle of July every year and features historic mikoshi portable shrines and a parade of floats, with Yosakoi dancing by dancers with naruko clappers in their hands.

Noted people from Fujimino
Hikari Ōta, comedian
Yumi Kakazu, voice actress
Shigenobu Shima, professional baseball player
Eri Nitta, musician and actress
Mari Hoshino, actress
Aoi Hiiragi, manga artist

References

External links

Official Website 

Cities in Saitama Prefecture
Fujimino, Saitama